"Wamp Wamp (What It Do)" is the second single from the 2006 Clipse album Hell Hath No Fury. The song features Slim Thug and was produced by The Neptunes.

It was the Unleashed video on MTV2 on October 30, 2006, and was the "New Joint" of the day on 106 & Park on November 3, 2006.

Chamillionaire and Pharrell make cameo appearances in the music video.

It has been remixed with Grizzly Bear's "Knife" by Girl Talk.

Charts

References

2006 singles
Clipse songs
Slim Thug songs
Song recordings produced by the Neptunes
Songs written by Pusha T
Songs written by Pharrell Williams
Songs written by The-Dream
2006 songs
Jive Records singles